Wendy Caroline Ager-Grant (born 2 July 1953) is a British foil fencer. She competed at the 1976 and 1980 Summer Olympics.

References

External links
 

1953 births
Living people
British female foil fencers
Olympic fencers of Great Britain
Fencers at the 1976 Summer Olympics
Fencers at the 1980 Summer Olympics